The DB Class 66 (German: Baureihe 66) was a class of two Deutsche Bundesbahn (DB) locomotives designed for fast goods train and passenger train services on the main and branch lines of Deutsche Bundesbahn (DB), the national railway of the former West Germany.

History
The Class 66 were one of several newly designed locomotive classes, the so-called Neubauloks, built for the DB after the Second World War. The 66s had a top speed of 100 km/h and an axle load of only 15 tonnes which made them ideally suited to such duties. They were intended to replace the former state railway (Länderbahn) locomotives of DRG classes 38.10 (ex-Prussian P 8), 78 (ex-Prussian T 18) and 93 (ex-Prussian T 14). However increasing competition from diesel locomotives meant that no more engines were built after the two prototype, even though they fully met all expectations and were a very successful design. The Class 66 was the penultimate locomotive class to be built as part of the DB's Neubaulok construction programme.

Design
The engines were equipped with a welded, high-performance boiler with a combustion chamber, roller bearings, a mixer preheater and a welded plate frame. Because great emphasis was placed on the working conditions for the engine driver and stoker, the Class 66 had a fully enclosed driver's cab, skylights, floor heating and upholstered seats with back rests. From autumn 1967 both engines were fitted equipment for working push-pull services.

Locomotive number 66 001 was retired in 1967 due to damage to its drive, and stored at Gießen; the second engine was retired in 1968.

Preservation 

Locomotive 66 002 was bought after its retirement by the German Railway History Company (Deutsche Gesellschaft für Eisenbahngeschichte or DGEG) and is currently (2007) homed in Bochum-Dahlhausen Railway Museum.

See also
 List of DB locomotives and railbuses

References 

 Modelleisenbahner: Prestige Projekt - 66.002. Mai 2007, Seite 26 - 29

66
066
2-6-4T locomotives
Henschel locomotives
Railway locomotives introduced in 1955
Passenger locomotives
Freight locomotives
Standard gauge locomotives of Germany
1′C2′ h2t locomotives